This is a list of drivers to have competed in the World Rally Championship-2 (formerly S-WRC). This list combines the two.

Updated after 2015 season.

Drivers

References

Lists of auto racing people
Drivers